Lavardeh (also Romanized as Lāvardeh) is a village in Jam Rural District, in the Central District of Jam County, Bushehr Province, Iran. At the 2006 census, its population was 245, in 51 families, averaging to about 4.80 (3 s.f) people per family.

References 

Populated places in Jam County